Clifton Township is the name of some places in the U.S. state of Minnesota:
Clifton Township, Lyon County, Minnesota
Clifton Township, Traverse County, Minnesota

See also
Clifton Township (disambiguation)
Minnesota township disambiguation pages